John Hoover may refer to:
John Hoover (artist) (1919–2011), American sculptor
John Hoover (baseball) (1962-2014), American baseball pitcher
J. Edgar Hoover (1895–1972), first director of the FBI, né John Edgar Hoover
John H. Hoover (1887–1970), American admiral
John J. Hoover (died 1880), American murderer lynched by a mob
John Hoover Rothermel (1856–1922), American politician, member of the House of Representatives from Pennsylvania